The 1999 IIHF World Women's Championships Pool B were held between March 21 – March 28, 1999, in the town of Colmar in France.

This was the first year of the Pool B tournament which saw Japan win the Pool with a 7–1 final game victory over Norway to promote them to the World Championship.  A third tier was played as well (called 2000 B Qualification) with six nations in Székesfehérvár, Hungary.

1999 Qualification Tournament

Group B contained the seven teams that failed to qualify for the main World Championships through the Qualification Process and Japan.

World Championship Group B
The eight participating teams were divided up into two seeded groups as below. The teams played each other once in a single round robin format. The top two teams from the group proceeded to the Final Round, while the remaining teams played in the consolation round.

The winning team in the tournament was promoted to the 2000 World Championship, while the bottom two teams would be relegated to the 2001 Group B Qualification tournament.

First round

Group A

Results
All times local

Group B

Results
All times local

Playoff round

Consolation round 5–8 place

Netherlands relegated to 2001 Group B Qualification.

Slovakia relegated to 2001 Group B Qualification.

Consolation round 7–8 place

Consolation round 5–6 place

Final round

Semifinals

Match for third place

Final

Champions

Scoring leaders

Goaltending leaders

Final standings

2000 Qualification Tournament
Six additional nations played in two regional qualifiers for entry into the 2000 world championship group B.  Both groups were played in Székesfehérvár, Hungary, with Group B being a best two out of three.

Group A

Italy qualified to 2000 World Championship Group B .

Group B

Kazakhstan qualified to 2000 World Championship Group B .

Scoring leaders

References

External links
 Summary from the Women's Hockey Net
 Detailed summary from passionhockey.com

Lower
World
1999
Sport in Colmar
March 1999 sports events in Europe
1998–99 in French ice hockey
Women's sports competitions in France